Football competitions have were first held at the Micronesian Games for the 1998 edition of the tournament. The event is open to the ten member federations of the Micronesian Games Council, a sub-regional member of the Oceania National Olympic Committees. The football tournament has been held at two subsequent games since 1998, in 2014 and 2018. Although a similar football tournament called the Micronesian Cup was held in 1999 and 2001, they were separate events as no Micronesian Games were held in those years.

Results by year

Matches

1998 
Football was played at the Micronesia Games for the first time in 1998. However, it was designed as an exhibition event that did not issue medals or count in the tournament standings. Additionally, the event was for 9-a-side teams on a field that was below regulation size with the matches being eighty minutes in length. All matches were played at the National Stadium in Koror, Palau. The Northern Mariana Islands defeated Guam in the final to become inaugural champions. Guam forward Matt Naputi was the tournament's top goal scorer with thirteen tallies.

Group stage

Finals

2014 
Four teams competed in the 2014 tournament. After initially intending to play, Kiribati withdrew from the tournament while Guam did not enter. The Northern Mariana Islands could not enter because of a schedule conflict with 2015 EAFF East Asian Cup qualification. All matches took place at PICS Field in Palikir, Pohnpei, Federated States of Micronesia.

Group stage

Finals

2018 
Three states of the Federated States of Micronesia (Chuuk, Pohnpei, and Yap) entered the tournament individually. Kosrae, Nauru, Kiribati, Northern Mariana Islands, the Marshall Islands, and Guam did not enter the football tournament despite competing in other events at the games. All matches were played at the Yap Sports Complex in Gagil, Yap, Federated States of Micronesia.

Group stage

Finals

References

Football